Tabanus similis, the striped horse fly, is a species of horse fly in the family Tabanidae.

Distribution
Canada, United States.

References

Tabanidae
Insects described in 1850
Taxa named by Pierre-Justin-Marie Macquart
Diptera of North America